Crinodon is an extinct genus of microsaur within the family Tuditanidae.

See also
 Prehistoric amphibian
 List of prehistoric amphibians

References 

Microsauria